XXXtra Manish is the debut album by American rapper Little Bruce, released October 11, 1994, on Sick Wid It and Jive Records. The album was produced by Mike Mosley, Sam Bostic and Studio Ton, and executive produced by B-Legit and E-40. The album peaked at number 60 on the Billboard Top R&B/Hip-Hop Albums chart. It features guest performances by Kaveo, Levitti, P-Dub and Funk Mobb (G-Note, K-1 & Mac Shawn).

Along with a single, a music video was released for the song, "Mobbin' In My Old School".

Track listing 
"Intro" – 3:05
"Raw Deal" (featuring Kaveo) – 4:42
"Mobbin' In My Old School" – 4:36
"I Love A Tramp" (featuring Mac Shawn) – 4:21
"Somethin' Terrible" – 4:07
"Funk Mobb Niggaz" (featuring Funk Mobb & P-Dub) – 5:16
"Fuck Little Bruce" – 4:23
"Lite Samethin'" – 4:58
"Now Like This" (featuring G-Note) – 4:15
"FootLocka Crew" – 3:56
"Cognac Killa" – 4:51
"Keep A Tre' 8" (featuring G-Note & Levitti) – 4:46

Charts

Personnel 

 B-Legit – rap
 Sam Bostic – guitar
 G-Note – rap
 K1 – rap
 Kaveo – rap

 Levitti – rap
 Mac Shawn – rap
 P-Dub – rap
 Studio Ton – guitar, bass guitar

References

External links 
[ XXXtra Manish] at Allmusic
XXXtra Manish at Discogs
XXXtra Manish at Tower Records

1994 debut albums
Albums produced by Studio Ton
Little Bruce albums
Jive Records albums
Sick Wid It Records albums